The Tybee Railroad was a US railroad that operated from 1887 to 1933. At its peak the railroad carried a quarter million people a year. The railroad was instrumental in the development of Tybee Island, Georgia, as a regional resort.

See also
 Daniel Gugel Purse Sr.
 Central of Georgia Railway

References

 
 

Defunct Georgia (U.S. state) railroads
Railway companies established in 1887
Railway companies disestablished in 1933